Viktor Troicki was the two-time defending champion, but lost in the semifinals to Gilles Müller.

Müller went on to win his first ATP title, defeating Daniel Evans in the final, 7–6(7–5), 6–2.

Seeds
The top four seeds receive a bye into the second round.

Draw

Finals

Top half

Bottom half

Qualifying

Seeds

Qualifiers

Lucky losers

Qualifying draw

First qualifier

Second qualifier

Third qualifier

Fourth qualifier

See also
 2017 Australian Open Series

Notes

References
 Main Draw
 Qualifying Draw

Men's Singles